Depth Charge is a 1960 British drama film directed by Jeremy Summers and starring Alex McCrindle, David Orr and Elliot Playfair. It was a B Film, shot partly on location in Berwickshire, and released by British Lion Films.

Cast
 Alex McCrindle as Skipper  
 David Orr as Lt. Forrester  
 Elliot Playfair as Jamie  
 J. Mark Roberts as Bob  
 Alex Allen as Secretary

References

Bibliography
 Murphy, Robert. Directors in British and Irish Cinema: A Reference Companion. British Film Institute, 2006.

External links

1960 films
1960 drama films
British black-and-white films
British drama films
1960s English-language films
Films directed by Jeremy Summers
Films set on ships
Films shot in Scotland
1960s British films